Yu Genwei (Chinese: 于根伟) (born 7 January 1974) is a former Chinese international footballer who played his entire career for Tianjin Teda as an attacking midfielder or striker. Internationally he represented the Chinese football team where he was a participant at the 2002 FIFA World Cup.

Club career
Beginning his football career for Tianjin Teda (then known as Tianjin FC) in the 1994 league season where he quickly established himself as an attacking midfielder when he scored 10 league goals and helped Tianjin win promotion to the top tier. He would help establish Tianjin as a regular within the top tier and would even personally win the Chinese Football Association Young Player of the Year at the end of the 1996 league season. By the 1997 league season Tianjin would have a disappointing season when they came eleventh in the league and were relegated from the top tier. Yu Genwei would however stay with Tianjin throughout the 1998 league season to help fight for immediate promotion which they achieved when they won the second tier. Once more within the top tier Yu Genwei would remain with Tianjin for the rest of his career to help establish them in the top tier.

International career
After Yu Genwei had just won the 1996 CFA Young Player of the Year award he would go on to be promoted to the Chinese senior team and make his debut in a friendly against South Korea on 30 August 1997 in a 0–0 draw. His performance was considered good enough to be included in several squads to play in China's unsuccessful 1998 FIFA World Cup qualification campaign, however due to his drop in form and Tianjin's relegation at the end of 1997 league campaign he would be  excluded from future squads until he picked up his form. After finding his goalscoring form and with Tianjin back playing in the top tier Yu would be given another chance to play for the China once again when the new Chinese Head coach Bora Milutinović included him in a friendly game against North Korea on 3 August 2001 in a 2–2 draw. After that game he would go on to establish himself as an integral member of the Chinese team and would score his first goal in a vital qualifying game against Oman that saw China qualify for the 2002 FIFA World Cup.

International goals

Honours

Club
Jia B League: 1998

Individual
CFA Young Player of the Year: 1996

Managerial statistics
As of December 18, 2022.

Note: win or lose by penalty shoot-out is counted as the draw in time.

References

External links
Player profile at BBC 2002 World Cup Squads

1974 births
Living people
Chinese footballers
Footballers from Tianjin
China international footballers
2002 FIFA World Cup players
Tianjin Jinmen Tiger F.C. players
Association football forwards
Association football midfielders
Tianjin Jinmen Tiger F.C. managers